Cemal Reşit Rey (25 October 1904 – 7 October 1985) was a Turkish composer, pianist, script writer and conductor. He was well known for a string of successful and popular Turkish-language operettas for which his brother Ekrem Reşit Rey (1900–1959) wrote the librettos.

He was born on 25 October 1904 in Jerusalem and died on 7 October 1985 in Istanbul. He was one of the five pioneers of Western classical music in Turkey known as 'The Turkish Five' in the first half of the 20th century. Notable students include Yüksel Koptagel, a Turkish composer and pianist.

Works
Operas
 La Geisha (adapted from Sydney Jones)
 Yann (Jann) Marek (1920)(Libretto by Xavier Fromentin)
 Faire sans dire (1920)(Libretto by Alfred de Musset)
 Sultan Cem (1922–23)(Libretto by Ekrem Reşid Rey)
 L'Enchantement (1924)(Libretto by Ekrem Reşid Rey)
 Zeybek("Zeibek") (1926)(Libretto by Ekrem Reşid Rey)
 Köyde Bir Facia (a Tragedy in the Village) (1929)(Libretto by Ekrem Reşid Rey)
 Çelebi (1942–73)(Libretto by Ekrem Reşid Rey)

Operettas
 Le Petit Chaperon rouge (1920)
 Üç Saat (Three Hours, 1932)(poems by Nazım Hikmet)
 Lüküs Hayat (The Luxurious Life, 1933)(Text by Ekrem Reşid Rey)
 Deli Dolu (Alive and Kicking, 1934)
 Saz Caz (1935)(Text by Ekrem Reşid Rey)
 Maskara (1936)(Text by Ekrem Reşid Rey)
 Hava Cıva (1937)(Text by Ekrem Reşid Rey)
 Yaygara 70 (1969–70)(Play by Erol Günaydın)
 Uy! Balon Dünya (1971)(Play by Erol Günaydın)
 Bir İstanbul Masalı (1972)(Play by Erol Günaydın)

Musical revues
 Adalar Revüsü (1934)
 Alabanda (1941)
 Aldırma (1942)

For theatre, film and radio
 Özyurt (prologue for soloist, chorus and orchestra)
 For Shakespeare's Macbeth
 For Shakespeare's Hamlet
 For Shakespeare's King Lear
· For Shakespeare's "Tempest"
 Lafonten Baba (children's play with music and dance)
 Bataklı Damın Kızı Aysel (film)
 Benli Hürmüz (Radio)

Orchestral works
 La Legende du Bebek (symphonic poem)
 Scènes turques
 Karagöz
 Paysages de soleil
 Instantanes (impressions for orchestra)
 Initiation (symphonic poem)
 Symphony No. 1 
 L'Appel (symphonic poem)
 Fatih (Le Conquérant) (symphonic poem)
 Scherzi symphoniques
 Symphonic Concerto
 Symphony No. 2
 Türkiye (symphonic poem) (1971)
 Ellinci Yıla Giriş (symphonic poem commemorating the 50th Anniversary of the Turkish Republic)

Concertos and concertantes
 "Introduction et Dance" for cello and orchestra
 "Concerto Chromatique" for piano and orchestra
 Poème for Ondes Martenot (or flute) and strings
 Violin Concerto
 "Pieces Concertantes" for Violoncello and Orchestra (dedicated to Pierre Fournier)
 Variations on an Old Istanbul Folk Song (Katibim) for piano and orchestra(dedicated to Samson François)
 "Andante et Allegro" for violin solo and string orchestra (dedicated to SUna Kan)
 Guitar Concerto (dedicated to Alirio Diaz)
 Concerto for piano and orchestra

Voice and orchestra
 Chants d'Anatolie (four songs, 1926)
 Two Songs (1930)
 Two Anatolian Folk Songs (1930) 
 Mystique (Tenor and Orchestra) (1938)
 Vocalise–Fantaisie (1975)(dedicated to Suna Korad)
 Three Anatolian Folk Songs (1977)
 Arrangements of Schubert, Brahms, Scarlatti, Paisiello for voice and strings

Choral works
 Çayır İnce (four-voice a capella)
  Two Pieces on Poems by Yunus Emre
 Anatolian Folk Songs (1926)
 Ten Folk Songs (four-voice chorus and piano, 1963)
 Two Songs (a capella women's chorus, 1936)

Voice and piano
 Je me demande (1919)
 Three Melodies (1920)
 Initiales sur un banc (1921)
 Chanson du printemps (1922)
 Au jardin (1923)
 L'Offrande lyrique (eight melodies, 1923)
 Nocturne (1925)
 Twelve Anatolian Folk Songs (1926)
 Folk Songs (1928)
 Twelve Melodies (1929)
 Vatan (1930)
 Four Melodies (1956)
 Paris Sokakları("Le Pecheur de Pergame")(Streets of Paris, 1981)

Chamber Music
 Impressions of Anatolia for violin and piano
 Piece for woodwind quintet
 String Quartet
 Short Piece for violin and piano
 Piano Quartet
 Sextet (piano, voice and string quartet)
 Instrumental Dialogue (flute, harp, 2 horns and string quartet)

Solo Piano
 Waltz (1912)
 Sonata (1924)
 Sarı Zeybek (1926)
 Scènes turques (1928)
 Souvenirs d'automne (?)
 Sonatina (1928)
 Paysages de soleil (1930–31)
 Sonata (1936)
 Pélerinages dans la ville qui n'est plus que souvenir (1940–41)
 Fantaisie (1948)
 Two Pieces (1959)
 Ten Folk Songs (1967)
 Improvisation (1983)
Music for Two Pianos
12 Preludes and Fugues (1968)

Marches
 Himaye-i Etfalin (Children's Protection March)
(Tenth Anniversary March of the Republic, 1933)
 Navy March (1935)
 Yedeksubay Marşı (1940)
 Atatürk's 100th Birthday March (1981)

Legacy
Cemal Reşit Rey Concert Hall in Istanbul is named after him.

References
Notes

Further Reading
 Aydin, Yilmaz (2002). Die Werke der 'Türkischen Fünf' im Lichte der Musikalischen Wechselbeziehungen zwischen der Türkei und Europa. Europäische Hochshculschriften, Peter Lang Publisher.

1904 births
1985 deaths
The Turkish Five
State Artists of Turkey
Turkish classical composers
20th-century classical composers
Male classical composers
Turkish opera composers
20th-century conductors (music)
20th-century male musicians